Daniel Solà Villa (born 3 January 1976) is a Spanish rally driver. He won the Junior World Rally Championship in 2002 and the Spanish Rally Championship in 2006.

Daniel "Dani" Solà debuted in the World Rally Championship in 1997 and won the junior class (JWRC) title with Citroën in 2002. In 2003, he contested the Production World Rally Championship with Mitsubishi, finishing fifth overall, and made his first World Rally Car appearances in a Citroën Xsara WRC for the Citroën Total.

In the 2004 season, Solà drove in three WRC events as an official Mitsubishi driver with the Lancer WRC, recording his first points with a sixth place at his home event, the Rally Catalunya. In 2005, he raced for Ford with a Ford Focus RS WRC in six WRC events, but did not manage to secure a full-time factory drive for the 2006 season. He achieved his first stage win at the 2005 Rally Catalunya.

In 2006, Solà won the Spanish Rally Championship with Citroën C2 S1600 and in 2007 he was competing in the Intercontinental Rally Challenge with a Honda Civic Type R.

Complete WRC results

JWRC Results

PWRC results

References

Official site 

Official site

1976 births
Living people
Spanish rally drivers
World Rally Championship drivers
Citroën Racing drivers